The women's 100 metres hurdles event at the 2013 Asian Athletics Championships was held at the Shree Shiv Chhatrapati Sports Complex. The final took place on 5 July.

Medalists

Results

Heats
First 3 in each heat (Q) and 2 best performers (q) advanced to the semifinals.

Wind: Heat 1: +0.1 m/s, Heat 2: -0.2 m/s

Final
Wind: -0.5 m/s

References
Results

100 Women's Hurdles
Sprint hurdles at the Asian Athletics Championships
2013 in women's athletics